The Descendants of Manuel I of Portugal, of the House of Aviz, left a lasting mark on Portuguese history and royalty, and European history and royalty as a whole. Manuel married three times, each time providing children. He first married Isabel of Aragon and Castile, followed by Maria of Aragon and Castile and lastly Eleanor of Austria.
 
His descendants can be found in both reigning and non-reigning royal families all over Europe.

This article deals with the children of Manuel I and in turn their senior heirs.

Background on Manuel I 

Manuel, born on 31 May 1469 at the Royal Palace at Alcochete, was the second son of Duke Ferdinand I of Viseu and Beja and Infanta Beatriz of Reguengos.

Throne of Portugal 
During Manuel's youth, his cousin John II of Portugal was King. John II went through a large process trying to eliminate the powers and wealth of the Portuguese nobility, of which Manuel was a prominent part of. John II had both Duke Diogo I of Viseu and Beja and Duke Fernando II of Braganza put on trial and executed. After Diogo's death, the Dukedoms of Viseu and Beja passed to Manuel, causing Manuel to fear for his own being.

In 1491, Afonso, Prince of Portugal was killed in a horse riding accident. John II only had one other child, Jorge, Duke of Coimbra, but he was illegitimate. After countless failed efforts by John II to legitimize Jorge, he finally sent a royal order to Manuel in 1493.

Once Manuel heard a royal order was on its way to him, he initially thought it to be a summons for a trial, and likely execution, and Manuel worried. However, when the order reached Manuel, he was greatly relieved as the order made Manuel the heir to John II's throne.

John II died on 25 October 1495 and Manuel became monarch of Portugal. During his reign, Manuel expanded the Portuguese Empire, making it the most formidable power in all of Europe at the time.

From his countless riches from India, after Vasco da Gama discovered the maritime passage to there, Manuel created the most luxurious court in all Europe and founded countless architectonic wonders throughout Portugal in the Manueline style, named for the king. It is this wealth, power, and prestige that made Manuel's children prime candidates for royal marriages throughout Europe.

After King Manuel's death, his descendants would hold a great importance to Portuguese sovereignty and European history. Almost all of Manuel's descendants would become crucial beings in the Portuguese succession crisis of 1580, the Iberian Union, and later the Portuguese Restoration War, as all the claims to the Portuguese throne during these events originated from descendancy from Manuel I.

Descendants by Isabel of Aragon and Castile 
On 13 September 1497, Manuel I married Isabel of Aragon and Castile, Princess of Asturias. The couple had 1 child:

Miguel, Prince of Asturias and Portugal

Descendants by Maria of Aragon and Castile 
On 30 October 1501, Manuel I married Maria of Aragon and Castile. The couple had 8 children:

John III of Portugal

Infanta Isabel of Portugal

Infanta Beatriz of Portugal

Infante Luís, Duke of Beja

Infante Fernando, Duke of Guarda and Trancoso

Cardinal-Infante Afonso of Portugal

Henrique I of Portugal

Infante Duarte I, Duke of Guimarães

Descendants by Eleanor of Austria 
On 16 July 1518, Manuel I married Eleanor of Austria. The couple had 2 children:

Infante Carlos

Infanta Maria, Duchess of Viseu

See also
Descendants of Miguel I of Portugal
Descendants of John VI of Portugal

Portuguese nobility
Portuguese royalty
House of Aviz
Manuel I of Portugal